Sineh Kuiyeh (also Romanized as Sīneh Kū’īyeh; also known as Sīneh Kūh) is a village in Ravar Rural District, in the Central District of Ravar County, Kerman Province, Iran. At the 2006 census, its population was 98, in 22 families.

References 

Populated places in Ravar County